Trapania hispalensis is a species of sea slug, a dorid nudibranch, a marine gastropod mollusc in the family Goniodorididae.

Distribution
This species was first described from the Straits of Gibraltar. It is found from Ceuta, North Africa to Faro, Portugal.

Description
This goniodorid nudibranch is translucent white in colour, with yellow markings. The rhinophores, gills and processes are covered with yellow pigment and there is a patch of yellow on the tail. It is very similar in colour to Trapania tartanella except that it has yellow markings with no tendency to become orange at the tips of the papillae, gills and rhinophores.

Ecology
Trapania hispalensis feeds on Entoprocta of the genus Loxosomella which often grow on the sponges Dysidea and Sarcotragus.

References

Goniodorididae
Gastropods described in 1989